Secret Garden is the fifth extended play (EP) by South Korean girl group Oh My Girl. It was released by WM Entertainment on January 9, 2018 and distributed by LOEN Entertainment. The album contains five songs, including the single "Secret Garden".

Background
On October 30, 2017, WM Entertainment confirmed that due to continued health issues, it was decided that JinE's contract would be terminated so she would officially depart from the group. The following day, Oh My Girl's agency confirmed that a new mini album was planned for a November release. In November, it was announced that the released would be delayed to January for "a goal of a more complete album". On December 23, 2017, WM Entertainment announced Oh My Girl's comeback for January 9, with their fifth EP entitled Secret Garden.

Track listing

Charts

Weekly

References

Oh My Girl albums
2018 EPs
Korean-language EPs
Kakao M EPs